Commandant of the Bird Island is a 1939 Soviet drama film directed by Vasili Pronin.

Plot 
The film tells about the sailor Kositsyn, who is on a desert island off the coast of Kamchatka, where he will have to prevent a group of Japanese smugglers from escaping.

Cast 
 Leonid Kmit as Kositsyn
 Nikolai Dorokhin as Commander of the Soviet boat 'Smely'
 Nikolay Gorlov as Ensign
 Mikhail Troyanovsky as Captain of a Japanese schooner
 Lev Potyomkin as Skipper of a Japanese schooner
 Aleksey Konsovsky as Japanese radio operator
 Pyotr Savin as Red-fledged
 Aleksandr Grechany as Red-fledged

References

External links 
 

1939 films
1930s Russian-language films
Soviet drama films
Soviet black-and-white films
1939 drama films
Films set on uninhabited islands